Tumaguin (variously Tamaguin, Tomaquin, or Tumaguin Islet) is a small, uninhabited island in the . Along with nearby Sicogon Island, it is part of Carles, Iloilo.

Location and geography
Tumaguin Island is located  due east of Sicogon Island.

Transport
Tumaguin Island is accessible from barangay Buaya in Sicogon by boat, or by foot during low tide.

See also

 List of islands in the Philippines
 List of islands
 Desert island

References

Islands of Iloilo
Uninhabited islands of the Philippines